"The Wife of Auchtermuchty" is a Scots poem of the fifteenth or sixteenth centuries.

The poem narrates how a farmer, envious of his wife's apparently easy life, proposes that the couple exchange their normal responsibilities. She will work the fields and he will take care of the home.
 
The wife agrees to the proposal and proves to be quite capable with a plough.

Meanwhile, under her husband's supervision, the housework descends into comical chaos. At the end of the day, with some encouragement from his shrewd and strong-willed wife, the husband decides that he has learnt a valuable lesson and will return to his plough.

"The Wife of Auchtermuchty" is characterised by physical humour and wry observations on the relationship between husband and wife. In contrast to most of the works of the contemporary makars it concentrates on the life and circumstances of ordinary people.

The poem gives a vivid depiction of domestic life in rural Scotland during the late medieval era.

The text

"The Wife of Auchtermuchty" is of uncertain date and authorship. The text is found only in the Bannatyne Manuscript which dates to the latter sixteenth century and contains works of the sixteenth and fifteenth centuries. As such the poem is most likely to be of this era.

In the manuscript an unidentified scribe, not George Bannatyne himself, attributes the piece to an author called only "Mofat".

The poem's first modern publication, with many modifications, was in The Ever Green of Allan Ramsay between 1724 and 1727.

The text given in this article is that from the Bannatyne Manuscript.

Historical context

The family depicted in the poem are tenant farmers in the lowlands of Scotland. They live with their livestock in a two-roomed cottage of the but and ben design. The but was an outer room, with external access, used for cooking, storage and other household work. The ben was an interior room, warmer and more comfortable than the but, used to accommodate the family.

The poem predates the introduction of draught horses in Scottish agriculture. The family's plough is pulled by oxen.

Synopsis

The husband's proposal

The narrator opens by describing a tenant farmer of Auchtermuchty who enjoys the small comforts of life. He attempts a day of ploughing in bad weather.

At the day's end he arrives home, "weary, wet and cold", to find his wife warming herself by the fire, clean and dry, with a bowl of soup.

He demands that the couple exchange their duties on the next day. The wife shall plough while he keeps the house.

The wife agrees and then describes what work will be required of him. The husband must tend to the livestock, sift, knead, keep their infant children clean, maintain the hearth and protect their goslings. In passing she reminds him that "We have a costly farm on our head."

The wife spends the rest of the evening churning a batch of butter and leaves only buttermilk instead of cream for her husband.

The wife and husband at work

The wife rises early the next morning and sets off for the fields carrying an unusually hearty lunch.

The husband rises next and his day starts badly when five out of seven goslings are taken by a hawk. Before he can recover his composure, some calves escape their pen and start to suckle at the cattle. While separating them he is gored in the buttock by an "ill willy cow". He returns home and attempts some spinning but spoils his work by sitting too close to the fire.

He moves on to the churning, previously sabotaged by his wife, and unsurprisingly does not produce much butter. While he is distracted by this a sow starts to drink the buttermilk. While driving it off with a stick he accidentally bludgeons the two remaining goslings. A series of other mishaps occur before he attends to the babies and discovers that they have soiled the bed.

He drags the dirty bedclothes to a burn for cleaning but they are washed away in the spate. In despair, the husband shouts to his wife in the fields for help. She pretends not to hear him and continues her ploughing until evening.

The conclusion

Upon arriving home the wife observes the chaos wrought by her husband.

After a quarrel the husband decides, with some persuasion from his cudgel-wielding wife, to return to his usual work.

Resource

A printed edition of 1803 which differs somewhat from the Bannatyne text. It is accompanied by a Latin translation.

References 

Scottish poems
Medieval poetry
Scots-language works
15th century in Scotland
15th-century poems
Agriculture in Scotland
Rural Scotland
Poetry of the Bannatyne Manuscript